Albert Curwood (31 December 1910 – 1971) was an English professional footballer. A centre forward, he was on the books of Blackpool Blackpool (having been transferred from Llanelli F.C where he started his football), Bournemouth & Boscombe Athletic , Swansea Town , Rochdale, Halifax Town and ending his career at Fleetwood Town. His grandson Steven Curwood is the Chief Executive at Fleetwood Town.

References

1910 births
1971 deaths
People from Bridgwater
English footballers
Association football forwards
Blackpool F.C. players
AFC Bournemouth players
Swansea City A.F.C. players
English Football League players